This list of words that may be spelled with a ligature in English encompasses words which have letters that may, in modern usage, either be rendered as two distinct letters or as a single, combined letter. This includes AE being rendered as Æ and OE being rendered as Œ. 

Until the early twentieth century, the œ and æ ligatures had been commonly used to indicate an etymological connection with Latin or Greek.  Since then they have fallen out of fashion almost completely and are now only used occasionally.  They are more commonly used for the names of historical people, to evoke archaism, or in literal quotations of historical sources.  These ligatures are proper letters in some Scandinavian languages, and so are used to render names from those languages, and likewise names from Old English. Some American spellings replace ligatured vowels with a single letter; for example, gynæcology or gynaecology is spelled gynecology.

The fl and fi ligatures, among others, are still commonly used to render modern text in fine typography.  Page-layout programs such as QuarkXPress and Adobe InDesign can be configured to automatically replace the individual characters with the appropriate ligatures.  However this is a typographic feature and not part of the spelling.

Given names
Note: The variants Ædith, Cœline and Matthœo were a used (see citations), hypercorrected form of the names.

Given names, that may be spelt with ß in German
The grapheme ß was originally made out of the characters Long S (ſ) and z, the latter of which evolved into s. In Germany, the grapheme is still used today. Throughout history, various names have been spelt with ß. Many of the spelling variations are hypercorrected variants of other spellings of the name. Nowadays, most of the spelling variations and names are considered archaic or obsolete.

Æ
Note that some words contain an ae which may not be written æ because the etymology is not from the Greek -αι- or Latin -ae- diphthongs.  These include:

 In instances of aer (starting or within a word) when it makes the sound IPA  (air). Comes from the Latin āër, Greek ἀήρ.
 When ae is found in a foreign phrase or loan word and it is unacceptable to use the ligature in that language. For example, when in a German loan word or phrase, if the a with an umlaut (ä) is written as ae, it is incorrect to write it with the ligature.

Œ

Notes
 The variants that change '-æ' or '-ae' to '-s' are not variants in spelling, but the same meaning of the word with a different way of forming plurals.
 "caesium" (see article) is preferred by the IUPAC.

Also, ligatures may be used in personal names as well, i.e. Maecenus as Mæcenus etc.

References

Lists of English words
English orthography